The 2018 The Hague Open was a professional tennis tournament played on clay courts. It was the 26th edition of the tournament and was part of the 2018 ATP Challenger Tour. It took place in Scheveningen, Netherlands between 16 and 22 July 2018.

Singles main-draw entrants

Seeds

 1 Rankings are as of 2 July 2018.

Other entrants
The following players received wildcards into the singles main draw:
  Thiemo de Bakker
  Jelle Sels
  Botic van de Zandschulp
  Tim van Rijthoven

The following players received entry from the qualifying draw:
  Elliot Benchetrit
  Gijs Brouwer
  Kimmer Coppejans
  Alejandro Davidovich Fokina

The following players received entry as lucky losers:
  Jeremy Jahn
  Marvin Netuschil

Champions

Singles

 Thiemo de Bakker def.  Yannick Maden 6–2, 6–1.

Doubles

 Ruben Gonzales /  Nathaniel Lammons def.  Luis David Martínez /  Gonçalo Oliveira 6–3, 6–7(8–10), [10–5].

External links
Official Website

2018 ATP Challenger Tour
2018
2018 in Dutch tennis